Miss America 1995, the 68th Miss America pageant, was held at the Boardwalk Hall in Atlantic City, New Jersey on Saturday, September 17, 1994 and was televised by the NBC Network.

Heather Whitestone, the winner representing Alabama, became the first deaf Miss America.

Results

Placements

Order of announcements

Top 10

Top 5

Awards

Preliminary awards

Quality of Life awards

Non-finalist awards

Other awards

Delegates

Judges
Dan Jansen
Buddy Morra
Susan Powell
Emma Samms
Cheryl Tiegs
Michael Feinstein
Susan L. Taylor

External links
 Miss America official website

1995
1994 in the United States
1995 beauty pageants
1994 in New Jersey
September 1994 events in the United States
Events in Atlantic City, New Jersey